Arenys de Munt (arenys being Catalan for "sands (of a seasonal creek)", and de munt for "up hill" as opposed to Arenys de Mar, "sands by the sea") is a municipality in the comarca of the Maresme in Catalonia, Spain. It is situated inland from the coast, in the  range and including the peak of el Montalt (595 m). It retains a textile industry specialised in the production of towels, and is also known for the production of strawberries, cherries and liqueurs. The B-511 road links the town with Arenys de Mar, Vallgorguina and Sant Celoni.

It is also the hometown of actor Daniel Brühl.

Politics

On September 13, 2009, the municipality held a symbolic referendum (with no legal status under the Spanish Constitution) on self-determination and independence for Catalonia. The participation rate was 41% (33% of the town's entire population, including those under the voting age). Over 96% of participating voters cast ballots in favour of independence. The referendum gave momentum to a movement for similar consultations to be held in other municipalities across Catalonia, including a co-ordinated vote in multiple municipalities, which was held a week later, on December 13.

Demography

See also
 Arenys de Munt query on Catalonia independence

References

Bibliography
 Panareda Clopés, Josep Maria; Rios Calvet, Jaume; Rabella Vives, Josep Maria (1989). Guia de Catalunya, Barcelona: Caixa de Catalunya.  (Spanish).  (Catalan).

External links

 Official website 
 Government data pages 
 Interesting Historic and Artistic places in Arenys de Munt 

Municipalities in Maresme
Populated places in Maresme